Kurekchay is one of the tributaries of the Kura River located in northwestern part of Azerbaijan.

On 14 May 1805, on the bank of the river (not far from Ganja), the signing of the Kurekchay Treaty took place, which transferred the Karabakh Khanate under Russian control.

See also 
 Bodies of water of Azerbaijan

References 

Rivers of Azerbaijan